Darkglass Electronics is a bass guitar equipment company based in Helsinki, Finland. Darkglass was founded in 2009 by Chilean engineer Douglas Castro.

Products 

The Darkglass product line includes several bass effects pedals, including Overdrive, Compressor and Fuzz. The company also manufactures amplifiers and cabinets.

References

External links 
 Darkglass Electronics
 Douglas Castro Interview
 Douglas Castro Interview

Music equipment manufacturers
Manufacturing companies based in Helsinki